Alvin Rouse (born 13 August 1982) is a former Barbadian footballer who most recently played as a goalkeeper for Fivemiletown United F.C.

Club career
From 1999–2003 he played for Barbados Defence Force SC in his native homeland, before signing for League of Ireland club Sligo Rovers in 2004. He left Rovers in 2005, and played for several other clubs including Macclesfield Town, Flixton, Monaghan United and Galway United, before signing for IFA Premiership club Dungannon Swifts in January 2009.
In October 2009 it was reported Rouse was the victim of racist abuse from fans of Ballymena United.The club were fined by the IFA, although Ballymena United appeal the fine.
Rouse left Dungannon at the end of the 2010 season after deciding to return home to Barbados. In his short time with the club, Rouse established himself as a fans favourite and the Swifts number one keeper with performances that got him recognised as one of the best goalkeepers in the league.

On 8 January 2011, it was confirmed that Rouse would be returning to the League of Ireland to play for Longford Town, but left the club at the end of the season.

In June 2012, he returned to the IFA Premiership, and signed a contract with Ballinamallard United, as the newly promoted Fermanagh based club looked to strengthen their squad for their first season in the top flight. Rouse had been without a club since leaving Longford in 2011. After 2 seasons at Ferney Park Alvin Rouse was released from the club

In May 2015, Rouse rejoined Ballinamallard United. He left the club in 2016 after budget cuts meant the club could no longer afford his wages.

On 14 June 2019 Rouse signed for Mid Ulster Intermediate A side  Fivemiletown United F.C. After spending two seasons in the Valley. Rouse retired after picking up a knee injury he decided to call it a day on a fantastic playing career.

International career
Rouse made his debut for Barbados in a September 2006 friendly match against Guyana. He has so far made 19 appearances for the national side.

References

External links
 

1982 births
Living people
Barbadian footballers
Barbados international footballers
Association football goalkeepers
Flixton F.C. players
Macclesfield Town F.C. players
English Football League players
Sligo Rovers F.C. players
Monaghan United F.C. players
Galway United F.C. (1937–2011) players
League of Ireland players
Dungannon Swifts F.C. players
Ballinamallard United F.C. players
NIFL Premiership players
Expatriate association footballers in the Republic of Ireland
Expatriate association footballers in Northern Ireland
Expatriate footballers in England
Barbados Defence Force SC players
Barbadian expatriate sportspeople in England
Barbadian expatriate sportspeople in Ireland
Fivemiletown United F.C. players